Hugo W.R. de Bruin is a Dutch rock guitarist. De Bruin played in Diesel for a two-year period and afterwards joined The Time Bandits in the mid eighties. In the early nineties he had a brief stint with Ten Sharp, who had a hit with the song 'You', with 20 million copies sold world-wide. De Bruin then became a composer/producer of film music and RTV commercials.

Discography
Money (LP, Album),	Philips, 1982
1234 (Vinyl, Mini-Album), Idiot Records, 1985
Can't Wait For Another World (2 verses), CBS, 1987
The More We Try, Columbia, 1993
Ten Sharp, Dreamhome (Dream On), Columbia, 1993
Lines On Your Face (radio verse), Columbia, 1993
Ten Sharp, Lines On Your Face (2 versies), Columbia, 1993
Rumors In The City, Columbia, 1993
Ten Sharp, The Fire Inside (3 versies), Columbia, 1993
Rumors In The City, Columbia, 1993
 Ten Sharp, Rumors In The City (2 versies), Sony Music Media, 2000
Right Or Wrong, Cheyenne (2) - Money (lp, album), Philips,	1982

External links
 Hugo at SoundCloud (recent work)
 Discogs

Year of birth missing (living people)
Living people
Dutch rock guitarists
Dutch male guitarists
Diesel (band) members